Eugene Coakley (born 7 March 1979) is an Irish rower. He finished 6th in the men's lightweight coxless four at the 2004 Summer Olympics.

References 
 
 

1979 births
Living people
Irish male rowers
Rowers at the 2004 Summer Olympics
Olympic rowers of Ireland
World Rowing Championships medalists for Ireland
21st-century Irish people